International Federation for Choral Music (IFCM) is an international association founded in 1982 to facilitate communication and exchange between choral musicians throughout the world. 

IFCM has around 900 members from all continents. The members are individuals, choirs, organisations or companies. Through the organisations and choirs IFCM plays a role in choral music and choral events in the world.
On the International Music Council of the UNESCO IFCM is the official representative of choral music.

Purposes
The purposes are fulfilled mainly through the following projects:
African Children Sing!
Musica International (Choral music database)
ChoralNet website
Conductors without borders
International Centre for Choral Music in Namur, Belgium
Master classes
OpusChoral
Regional symposia
Songbridge
World Choral Census
International Choral Bulletin
World day of Choral singing
World symposium on Choral music
World Symposium 2011 in Puerto Madryn, Argentina
World Chamber Choir
World Youth Choir
Youth Committee

Organizations
IFCM was founded by seven national and international choral organizations from five continents. These are:
The American Choral Directors Association ACDA
A Coeur Joie International (France)
Arbeitsgemeinschaft Europäsicher Chorverbände (Europa)
Asociación Interamericana de Directores de Coros (Latin America)
Europa Cantat - Federation Européenne des Jeunes Chorales (Europe)
Japan Choral Association (Japan)
Nordisk Korforum - (Scandinavia)

References

External links
Official web site
World Youth Choir Official web site
Musica International Choral Repertoire Database official web site 

International music organizations
Organizations established in 1982
Vocal and choral music organizations
International organizations based in the United States